List of poets who have written in the French language:

A
 Louise-Victorine Ackermann (1813–1890)
 Adam de la Halle (v.1250 – v.1285)
 Pierre Albert-Birot (1876–1967)
 Anne-Marie Albiach (1937–2012)
 Pierre Alféri (1963)
 Marc Alyn (1937)
 Catherine d'Amboise (1475–1550)
 Jean Amrouche (1906–1962)
 Guillaume Apollinaire (1880–1918)
 Louis Aragon (1897–1982)
 Jacques Arnold (1912–1995)
 Hans Arp (1887–1966)
 Antonin Artaud (1896–1948)
 Théodore Agrippa d'Aubigné (1552–1630)
 Jacques Audiberti (1899–1965)
 Pierre Autin-Grenier (1947)

B
 Jean-Antoine de Baïf (1532–1589)
 Théodore de Banville (1823–1891)
 Jules Barbey d'Aurevilly (1807–1889)
 Henri Auguste Barbier (1805–1882)
 Natalie Clifford Barney (1876–1972)
 Linda Maria Baros (1981)
 Guillaume de Salluste Du Bartas (1544–1590)
 Henry Bataille (1872–1922)
 Henry Bauchau (1913–2012)
 Charles Baudelaire (1821–1867)
 Marcel Béalu (1908–1993)
 Philippe Beck (1963)
 Samuel Beckett (1906–1989)
 Joachim du Bellay (1522–1560)
 Rémy Belleau (1528–1577)
 Charles Beltjens (1832–1890)
 Tahar Ben Jelloun (1944)
 Isaac de Benserade (1612–1691)
 Annie Bentoiu (1927–2015)
 Pierre-Jean de Béranger (1780–1857)
 Christian Bernard (1950)
 Béroul (12th century)
 Louky Bersianik (1965)
 Aloysius Bertrand (1807–1841)
 Gérard Bessière (1928)
 Maurice Blanchot (1907–2003)
 Blondel de Nesle (12th–13th centuries)
 Christian Bobin (1951)
 Jean Bodel (1165–1210)
 Étienne de La Boétie (1530–1563)
 Nicolas Boileau-Despréaux (1636–1711)
 Bonaventure Des Périers (1500–1544)
 Yves Bonnefoy (1923–2016)
 Pétrus Borel (1809–1859)
 Bertran de Born (1150–1215 ?)
 Robert de Boron (12th–13th centuries)
 Théodore Botrel (1868–1925)
 André du Bouchet (1924–2001)
 Daniel Boulanger (1922–2014)
 Stéphane Bouquet (1967)
 Joë Bousquet (1897–1950)
 Georges Brassens (1921–1981)
 Jacques Brault (1933)
 André Breton (1896–1966)
 Nicole Brossard (1943)
 Aristide Bruant (1851–1925)
 Gace Brulé (c.1160 – after 1213)
 Andrée Brunin (1937–1993)
 Michel Butor (1926–2016)

C
 Louis Calaferte (1928–1994)
 Susana Calandrelli (1901–1978)
 Jean-Pierre Calloc'h (1888–1917)
 Émile Cammaerts (1878–1953)
 Côtis-Capel (1915–1986)
 Placide Cappeau (1808–1877)
 Adolphe Joseph Carcassonne (1826–1891)
 Francis Carco (1886–1958)
 Maurice Carême (1899–1978)
 Jean Cayrol (1911–2005)
 Blaise Cendrars (1887–1961)
 Aimé Césaire (1913–2008)
 Jean Chapelain (1595–1674)
 Maurice Chappaz (1916–2009)
 René Char (1907–1988)
 Alain Chartier (1385–1430)
 François-René de Chateaubriand (1768–1848)
 Malcolm de Chazal (1902–1981)
 Andrée Chedid (1920–2011)
 Charles-Julien Lioult de Chênedollé (1769–1833)
 François Cheng (1929)
 André Chénier (1762–1794)
 Jacques Chessex (1934–2009)
 Chrétien de Troyes (c.1135 – c.1183)
 Paul Claudel (1868–1955)
 William Cliff (1940)
 Jean Cocteau (1889–1963)
 Gabrielle de Coignard (1550–1586)
 Louise Colet (1810–1876)
 Danielle Collobert (1940–1978)
 Claude Confortès (1928–2016)
 Conon de Béthune (c.1150 – 1220)
 Benoît Conort (1956)
 François Coppée (1842–1908)
 Tristan Corbière (1845–1875)
 Pierre Corneille (1606–1684)
 Charles Cotin (1604–1681)
 Gaston Couté (1880–1911)
 Watriquet de Couvin (active 1319–1329)
 Octave Crémazie (1827–1879)
 René Crevel (1900–1935)
 Charles Cros (1842–1888)

D
 Jean Daive (1941)
 Léon-Gontran Damas (1914–1978)
 René Daumal (1908–1944)
 François David (1950)
 Anne-Marie de Backer (1908–1987)
 Lise Deharme (1898–1979)
 Lucie Delarue-Mardrus (1880–1945)
 Yanette Delétang-Tardif (1902–1976)
 Jacques Delille (1738–1813)
 René Depestre (1926)
 Tristan Derème (1889–1941)
 Paul Déroulède (1846–1914)
 Maryline Desbiolles (1959)
 Marceline Desbordes-Valmore (1786–1859)
 Émile Deschamps (1791–1871)
 Eustache Deschamps (1346–1406)
 Robert Desnos (1900–1945)
 Philippe Desportes (1546–1606)
 Jean-Pierre Desthuilliers (1939)
 Bruno Destrée (1867–1919)
 Léon Deubel (1879–1913)
 Souéloum Diagho
 Mohammed Dib (1920–2003)
 David Diop (1927–1960)
 Charles Dobzynski (1929))
 Jean Dorat (1508–1588)
 Hélène Dorion (1958)
 Christian Dotremont (1922–1979)
 Minou Drouet (1947)
 Caroline Dubois (1960)
 Bernard Dubourg (1945–1992)
 Georges Duhamel (1884–1966)
 Jacques Dupin (1927–2012)
 Jean-Pierre Duprey (1930–1959)

E
 Paul Éluard (1895–1952)
 Claude Esteban (1935–2006)

F
 Nabile Farès (1940)
 Léon-Paul Fargue (1876–1947)
 Jean-Pierre Faye (1925)
 Léo Ferré (1916–1993)
 Jean Follain (1903–1971)
 Xavier Forneret (1809–1884)
 Paul Fort (1872–1960)
 Marie de France (1154–1189)
 Martin Le Franc (1410–1461)
 Frankétienne (1936)
 Pauline Fréchette (1889-1943)
 André Frédérique (1915–1957)
 Jean Froissart (v.1337-v.1410)

G
 Pierre Gabriel (1926–1994)
 Serge Gainsbourg (1928–1991)
 Augièr Galhard (16th-century)
 Pierre Gamarra (1919–2009)
 Joachim Gasquet (1873–1921)
 Armand Gatti (1924–2017)
 Théophile Gautier (1811–1872)
 Jean Genet (1910–1986)
 Amélie Gex (1835–1883)
 Henri Ghéon (1875–1644)
 Roger Gilbert-Lecomte (1907–1943)
 Iwan Gilkin (1858–1924)
 Roger Giroux (1925–1974)
 Edouard Glissant (1928–2011)
 Guy Goffette (1947)
 Claire Goll (1890–1977)
 Yvan Goll (1891–1950)
 Jean Ogier de Gombauld (1576–1666)
 Remy de Gourmont (1858–1915)
 Xavier Grall (1930–1981)
 Benoît Gréan
 Jean-Baptiste-Louis Gresset (1709–1777)
 Jacques Grévin (1538–1570)
 Jean Grosjean (1912–2006)
 Maurice de Guérin (1810–1839)
 Georges Guillain (1947)
 Guillaume de Lorris (c.1200 – c.1238)
 Pernette du Guillet (1520–1545)
 Eugène Guillevic (1907–1997)

H
 Adam de la Halle (1237–1288)
 Anne Hébert (1916–2000)
 Markus Hediger (1959)
 Bernard Heidsieck (1928–2014)
 Georges Henein (1914–1973)
 José-Maria de Heredia (1842–1905)
Antoine Héroet (d. 1567)
 Michel Houellebecq (1958)
 Victor Hugo (1802–1885)
 Marie Huot (1965)

I
 Jacques Izoard (1936–2008)

J
 Edmond Jabès (1912–1991)
 Philippe Jaccottet (1925–2021)
 Max Jacob (1876–1944)
 Francis Jammes (1868–1938)
 Amadis Jamyn (1538–1592)
 Alfred Jarry (1873–1907)
 Sandra Jayat (c.1939)
 Georges Jean (1920–2011)
 Jean de Meung (1250 – c.1305)
 Étienne Jodelle (1532–1573)
 Jean Joubert (1928–2015)
 Jacques Jouet (1947)
 Alain Jouffroy (1928–2015)
 Pierre Jean Jouve (1887–1976)
 Charles Juliet (1934)

K
 Gustave Kahn (1859–1936)
 Kama Sywor Kamanda (1952)
Abdelkebir Khatibi (1938–2009)
 Vénus Khoury-Ghata (1937)
 Tristan Klingsor (1874–1966)
 Anise Koltz (1928)
 Petr Kral (1941–2020)
 Seyhan Kurt (1971)

L
 Abdellatif Laâbi (1942)
 Louise Labé (1524–1566)
 Pierre Labrie (1972)
 Jacques Lacarrière (1925–2005)
 Jean de La Fontaine (1621–1695)
 Jules Laforgue (1860–1887)
 Jean Lahor (1840–1909)
 Alphonse de Lamartine (1790–1869)
 Bernard de La Monnoye (1641–1728)
 Jane de La Vaudère (1857-1908)
 Valery Larbaud (1881–1957)
 Josaphat-Robert Large (1942)
 Rina Lasnier (1910–1997)
 Isidore Ducasse, comte de Lautréamont (1846–1870)
 Pierre-Antoine Lebrun (1785–1873)
 Félix Leclerc (1914–1988)
 Leconte de Lisle (1818–1894)
 Michel Leiris (1901–1990)
 Jean Lemaire de Belges (1473–1520)
 Charles Le Quintrec (1926–2008)
 Jean-François Leriget de La Faye (1674–1731)
 Alain Le Roux (1949)
 Hervé Le Tellier (1957)
 Henry Jean-Marie Levet (1874–1906)
 Tristan L'Hermite (1601–1655)
 Liska (1956–2011)
 Guillaume de Lorris (1200–1240)
 Pierre Louÿs (1870–1925)
 Ghérasim Luca (1913–1994)
 Jean-Pierre Luminet (1951)

M
Guillaume de Machaut
Maurice Maeterlinck
François de Malherbe
Stéphane Mallarmé
Pierre de Marbeuf
Clément Marot
Jean Marot
Anne de Marquets
Fabien Marsaud
Charles Maurras
Catulle Mendès
Élisa Mercœur (1809–1835)
Thierry Metz
Jean de Meun
Henri Michaux
Jean Michel
Jean Moréas
Hégésippe Moreau
Colin Muset
Alfred de Musset

N
Marguerite de Navarre
Émile Nelligan
Gérard de Nerval

O
René de Obaldia
Charles, duc d'Orléans

P
Évariste de Parny
Charles Péguy
Benjamin Péret
Louis Pergaud
Saint-John Perse
Christine de Pizan
Francis Ponge
Jacques Prévert
Guiot de Provins
Sully Prudhomme

Q
Raymond Queneau

R
Nicolas Rapin
Henri de Régnier
Pierre Reverdy
Arthur Rimbaud
Jules Romains
Pierre de Ronsard
Jaufré Rudel
Rutebeuf

S
Janou Saint-Denis
Hector de Saint-Denys Garneau
Mellin de Saint-Gelais
Jean François de Saint-Lambert
Benoît de Sainte-Maure
André Salmon
Albert Samain
Henriette Sauret
Paul Scarron
Maurice Scève
Georges Schehadé
Pierre Seghers
Léopold Senghor
Louisa Siefert
Dominique Sorrente
Philippe Soupault
André Spire
Jules Supervielle

T
Taillefer
Jean de La Taille
Jean Tardieu
Thomas of Britain
Khal Torabully
Julien Torma
Paul-Jean Toulet
Roland Michel Tremblay
Chrétien de Troyes
Pontus de Tyard
Tristan Tzara

V
Paul Valéry
Jean-Pierre Vallotton
Léonise Valois 
Jean Venturini
Serge Venturini
Emile Verhaeren
Paul Verlaine
Francis Viélé-Griffin
Boris Vian
Claude Vigée
Alfred de Vigny
François Villon
Roger Vitrac
Vincent Voiture
Voltaire

References

See also
Other French poets in the French Wikipedia
French literature
Francophone literature
List of French-language authors
List of French novelists
List of French people
Lists of Canadians

French